KVSS (102.7 FM) is a radio station which airs a Catholic format. Licensed to Papillion, Nebraska, United States, the station serves the Omaha area. KVSS's studios are located on West A Street in Omaha (with auxiliary studios located in Lincoln and Grand Island). Its transmitter is located just south of Gretna, Nebraska.

History

KVSS
In January 1999, VSS Catholic Communications, Inc. KNOS, a 500-watt signal from Bill Thompson, and immediately began broadcasting a mix of contemporary Christian music and Catholic programming from the EWTN Radio Network on the 88.9 FM frequency. Additional programming followed from St. Joseph Communications, Catholic Answers, Ave Maria and Starboard Communications. After broadcasting for 10 years on a small signal, VSS partnered with Kolbe Media, a group of people committed to Catholic Radio in the Lincoln, Nebraska, community. On January 29, 2009, Spirit Catholic Radio purchased a new 50,000-watt signal on 102.7 FM and expanded to reach both the Omaha and Lincoln communities, as well as over 1 million potential listeners throughout eastern Nebraska and western Iowa. Its former frequency was sold to the Bible Broadcasting Network and is now KYFG.

KVSS is a non-profit, listener-supported radio station.

102.7 history
Beginning in early 1980, the frequency was home to Lincoln's KFRX, which initially aired an album rock format before shifting to its long running Top 40 format in July 1983. In 2007, after Clear Channel sold their Lincoln stations to Three Eagles Communications, Three Eagles spun off 102.7 FM and KRKR to Chapin Communications in order to meet ownership limits. This arrangement was only temporary, as Chapin was the intermediate buyer while a permanent buyer was being sought. On September 18, 2007, KFRX moved their format to sister station 106.3 FM, while 102.7 FM began stunting with a loop directing listeners to the new frequency. A week later, 102.7 FM (now under the KLMY call letters, which later changed to KBZR) flipped to a soft AC format, branded as "102.7 The Breeze." As part of the changes, the station was granted a construction permit to change city of license from Lincoln to Papillion, and transmitter site from Lincoln to Gretna, in order to move into the Omaha market. After a successful fund raiser needed in order to purchase KBZR, the Federal Communications Commission (FCC) approved the sale of the station from Chapin to KVSS in late December 2008, and the station went on air with its new signal on January 29, 2009, and then moved to the Gretna tower and began broadcasting at that site on June 9.

References

External links

 

Catholic radio stations
Radio stations established in 1999
1999 establishments in Nebraska

VSS